Daasi (English: Slave)  is a 2019 Pakistani romantic drama television series co-produced by Momina Duraid and Moomal Shunaid under their production banners MD Productions and Moomal Entertainment. It features Mawra Hocane, Adeel Hussain and Faryal Mehmood. It was aired on Hum TV from 16 September 2019 to 13 April 2020.

Cast

 Adeel Hussain as Ahil
 Mawra Hocane as Sunehri
 Faryal Mehmood as Alia
 Kamran Jilani as Shahabuddin
 Hina Khawaja Bayat as Ahil's mother
 Furqan Qureshi as Adil
 Adnan Jaffar as Touqeer
 Naima Butt
 Mohsin Ejaz as Mujtaba
 Fazila Kaiser as Sunehri's mother

Soundtrack 
The soundtrack is composed by Waqas Azeem on lyrics of Ali Moeen. It is sung by Wajji Ali.

References

Hum TV
Hum TV original programming
2019 Pakistani television series debuts
Pakistani romantic drama television series
Television series by MD Productions
Television series created by Momina Duraid
Urdu-language television shows
MD Productions